Osias is both a given name and surname. Notable people with the name include:

Osias Beert (1580–1623/24), Flemish painter
Osias Godin (1911–1988), Canadian politician
Camilo Osías (1889–1976), Filipino politician

See also
Osia Lewis (1962–2020), American football player